Eğrikavak can refer to:

 Eğrikavak, Aydın
 Eğrikavak, Maden